Comfits are confectionery consisting of dried fruits, nuts, seeds or spices coated with sugar candy, often through sugar panning. Almond comfits (also known as "sugared almonds" or "Jordan almonds") in a muslin bag or other decorative container are a traditional gift at baptism and wedding celebrations in many countries of Europe and the Middle East, a custom which has spread to other countries such as Australia and Puerto Rico. Licorice comfits (sometimes sold as torpedoes)  are typically multi-colored, while almond comfits are usually white for weddings and may be brightly colored for other occasions.

A late medieval recipe for comfits is based on anise seeds, and suggests also making comfits with fennel, caraway, coriander, and diced ginger. These aniseed comfits seem to be a precursor of modern aniseed balls.

See also
Kompeito
Dragée
Sugar plums
Mukhwas
Good & Plenty
London drops, a similar candy sold in Finland and Sweden
Sprinkles
Confectionery in the English Renaissance

References

Confectionery
Almond desserts